Drill was an American alternative/hard rock band from New York City, United States, that formed in 1993. The band is perhaps best known as being headed by vocalist Lucia Cifarelli, with members that included guitarist Dan Harnett, future Black Label Society bassist John DeServio, and drummer Marcus Farny.

The band split up shortly after the release of their 1995 self-titled album Drill, which featured additional guitarist Paul Alves. Cifarelli went on to join industrial rock bands MDFMK and KMFDM.

Albums
 Drill, 1995

Further reading

References

Alternative rock groups from New York (state)
Musical groups disestablished in 1996
Musical groups established in 1993
1993 establishments in New York City
1996 disestablishments in the United States
A&M Records artists